Zweigen Kanazawa (ツエーゲン金沢, Tsuēgen Kanazawa) is a Japanese football club based in Kanazawa, Ishikawa Prefecture. They currently play in the J2 League, Japan's 2nd tier of professional league football.

History
The club was formed in 1956 under the simple name Kanazawa Soccer Club and adopted its current identity in 2006. The Hokushinetsu region, long sleepy in football terms and whose potential only arose with Albirex Niigata leading the way, provided few opportunities for Kanazawa to rise in Japan's football ranks until the late 2000s. On 19 December 2009 they were promoted to the JFL after beating FC Kariya at the promotion/relegation playoff with 2–1 aggregate score, following a third-place finish in the 2009 All Japan Regional Football Promotion League Series.

On December 15, 2010, a new management company called Zweigen, Inc. was established in order to apply to the J-League associate membership.

On January 7, 2011 the team applied for J-League associate membership.

On 16 November 2014, Zweigen became the inaugural J3 League champions, and gained a licence to compete in J2 League from 2015. The club will play their 9th consecutive season at the J2 League on 2023.

Name and symbolism
The name "Zweigen" is a portmanteau of the German zwei, for the number 2, and gen, to advance. In Kanazawa dialect, the phrase tsuyoi noda! (We're strong!) became tsuee gen! by double entendre. In German, the word Zweigen means branches (dative—nominative: Zweige), and owing to this, a fleur-de-lis is a key part of the club's crest.

Stadium
Their home stadium is the Ishikawa Kanazawa Stadium. The capacity is 20,261. The stadium was built on 1974.

The new Kanazawa Football Stadium has been in construction since 2022, and it is scheduled to be finished by the end of 2023.

League & cup record

Key

Honours
J3 League
Champions: 2014

Current squad
As of 22 February 2023.

Out on loan

Coaching staff
For the 2023 season.

Managerial history 

Key

Kit evolution

References

External links
  

 
Football clubs in Japan
Kanazawa
Sports teams in Ishikawa Prefecture
2006 establishments in Japan
Kanazawa
1956 establishments in Japan
Japan Football League clubs
J.League clubs